Freuler is a surname. Notable people with the surname include:

Charles Freuler, Swiss rower
John R. Freuler (1872–1958), American businessman
Remo Freuler (born 1992), Swiss footballer
Rick Freuler, American aerospace engineer
Urs Freuler (born 1958), Swiss cyclist